Julien Raymond Huntley professionally known as Jul Big Green (born March 25, 1990) is an American singer, musician, songwriter, actor and audio producer.

Biography
Jul is from Cleveland, Ohio. He performs in diverse styles that range from pop to hip-hop and jazz acoustics. Growing up in a musical family led him to develop a passion for the art at a young age. This passion would later drive him to receiving a Bachelor of Arts degree in music from the University of Akron graduating in 2013 and also to start his solo and group projects under the name Jul Big Green. Jul released his first full-length album All Things in May 2015.

Jul's name is in part a nod to his style of always wearing green in public. He has performed as a solo artist or with his full band at many locations around Cleveland and has also done several tours touching Florida, Michigan, and New York. He has also been a guest performer on Cleveland news stations such as Fox 8 News.

References

1990 births
Living people
21st-century American singers
21st-century American male singers